Arzana is a comune (municipality) in the Province of Nuoro in the Italian region Sardinia, located about  northeast of Cagliari and about  west of Tortolì.

Arzana borders the following municipalities: Aritzo, Desulo, Elini, Gairo, Ilbono, Jerzu, Lanusei, Seui, Seulo, Tortolì, Villagrande Strisaili, Villaputzu. 
In the town of Arzana stands Punta la Marmora, the highest peak in Sardinia.

People
 Stanis Dessy, artist
 Anselmo Contu, political
 Attilio Cubeddu, former member of Anonima sarda
 Samuele Stochino bandit

References

Cities and towns in Sardinia
Articles which contain graphical timelines